Mubuku III Power Station is a  mini-hydroelectric power station in Uganda.

Location
The power station is located across the Mubuku River, near the town of Mubuku, Kasese District, in Western Uganda. This location lies in the foothills of the Rwenzori Mountains, close to the border with the Democratic Republic of the Congo.

Overview
The Mubuku III Power Station, is a run of the river mini-hydropower installation, with installed capacity of 10 MW. It became operational in 2008, having been built by Kasese Cobalt Company Limited, a company that extracts cobalt from the sludge left when copper is extracted out of copper ore. The excess power generated is sold to the national grid. Mubuku III Power Station is the third mini-hydropower station on River Mubuku. The other two are Mubuku I Power Station, owned and operated by Kilembe Mines Limited, with installed capacity of 5 MW and Mubuku II Power Station, also known as Bugoye Power Station, with capacity of 13 MW, owned by Tronder Power Limited, a Norwegian company.

See also

Uganda power stations
Africa power stations
Hydropower stations

References

External links
  Estimated Location of Mubuku III Power Station At Google Maps
 Kasese District Homepage

Energy infrastructure completed in 2008
Hydroelectric power stations in Uganda
Kasese District
Western Region, Uganda